Fábio Luciano (born April 29, 1975 in Vinhedo, Brazil) is a Brazilian football pundit and retired footballer who played as a defender. He also has Italian citizenship. He played for Brazil's major clubs Corinthians and Flamengo, being very well recognized by the supports from both clubs and for several other clubs including Turkish team Fenerbahçe.

Career

Early career
His youth playing was brought up at the Brazilian club Ponte Preta. After showing good talent, Internacional showed interest in him. After buying him, Corinthians had gained an even bigger interest. After some time, they made a move.

Fenerbahçe
After spending a couple of years at Corinthians, he was transferred to Turkish club Fenerbahçe in 2003. He was selected a couple times for Brazil after showing consistent performances for Fenerbahçe in the 2003–2004 season. In August 2006 his contract with Fenerbahçe was cancelled about his six-month injury.

He is notorious for his presence in the attack, as shown in many games with his former club Fenerbahçe, having scored goals with headers from dead ball situations and even supported the forward line unexpectedly. He became a fan favorite with his spectacular dead ball goals for Fenerbahçe fans.

In January 2007, he signed a six-month contract with German side 1. FC Köln.

Flamengo
By mid-2007, Luciano signed a six-month contract with Brazilian side Flamengo. He debuted on August 11, 2007 against Náutico in Maracanã and was granted the captain armband by coach Joel Santana. On the same match he scored his first goal for the club, and since then started a strong connection with Flamengo supporters, especially the younger ones, who were not old enough to remember idols of the older days. He renewed his contract until the end of 2008 season and then extended it for another year.

In May 2009, after winning the Rio state championship, Luciano decided to retire.

Flamengo career statistics
(Correct )

according to combined sources on the Flamengo official website and Flaestatística.

Honours

Club
Corinthians
 FIFA Club World Championship: 2000
 Rio-São Paulo Tournament: 2002
 São Paulo State Championship: 2001, 2003
 Brazilian Cup: 2002
Fenerbahçe
 Turkcell Super League: 2004, 2005
Flamengo
 Taça Guanabara: 2008
 Taça Rio: 2009
 Rio de Janeiro State League: 2008, 2009

Individual
Bola de Prata: best central defender of the 2002 Brazilian Série A.

References

External links
 
 Fábio Luciano at ogol.com.br 

1975 births
Living people
Brazilian footballers
Brazilian expatriate footballers
Brazilian people of Italian descent
Brazil international footballers
2003 FIFA Confederations Cup players
Campeonato Brasileiro Série A players
Süper Lig players
2. Bundesliga players
Associação Atlética Ponte Preta players
Sport Club Corinthians Paulista players
Sport Club Internacional players
1. FC Köln players
Fenerbahçe S.K. footballers
CR Flamengo footballers
Expatriate footballers in Germany
Expatriate footballers in Turkey
Brazilian expatriate sportspeople in Turkey
Association football defenders